The beheading of John the Baptist, also known as the decollation of Saint John the Baptist or the beheading of the Forerunner, is a biblical event commemorated as a holy day by various Christian churches. According to the New Testament, Herod Antipas, ruler of Galilee under the Roman Empire, had imprisoned John the Baptist because he had publicly reproved Herod for divorcing his first wife and unlawfully taking his sister-in-law (his brother’s wife) as his second wife Herodias.  He then ordered him to be killed by beheading. 

As a non-Biblical source, Jewish historian Josephus also recounts that Herod had John imprisoned and killed, stating, however, that the real reason Herod had for doing so was "the great influence John had over the people", which might persuade John "to raise a rebellion (for they seemed ready to do anything he should advise)". Josephus further states that many of the Jews believed that the military disaster that later on fell upon Herod was God's punishment for his unrighteous behavior towards John.

Traditional accounts
According to the synoptic Gospels, Herod, who was  tetrarch, or sub-king, of Galilee under the Roman Empire, had imprisoned John the Baptist because he reproved Herod for divorcing his wife (Phasaelis, daughter of King Aretas of Nabataea) and unlawfully taking Herodias, the wife of his brother Herod Philip I. On Herod's birthday, Herodias' daughter (whom Josephus identifies as Salome) danced before the king and his guests. Her dancing pleased Herod so much that in his drunkenness he promised to give her anything she desired, up to half of his kingdom. When Salome asked her mother what she should request, she was told to ask for the head of John the Baptist on a platter. Although Herod was appalled by the request, he reluctantly agreed and had John executed by beheading in the prison. In art, the episode is known as The Feast of Herod.

Jewish historian Josephus also relates in his Antiquities of the Jews that Herod killed John, stating that he did so, "lest the great influence John had over the people might put it into his [John's] power and inclination to raise a rebellion, (for they seemed ready to do any thing he should advise), [so Herod] thought it best [to put] him to death." He further states that many of the Jews believed that the military disaster that fell upon Herod at the hands of Aretas, his father-in-law (Phasaelis' father), was God's punishment for his unrighteous behavior.

None of the sources gives an exact date, which was probably in the years 2829 AD after imprisoning John the Baptist in 27 AD (Matthew 4:12) at the behest of Herodias his brother's wife whom he took as his mistress.; According to Josephus, the death took place at the fortress of Machaerus.

Feast day
The liturgical commemoration of the Beheading of St. John the Baptist is almost as old as that commemorating his birth, which is one of the oldest feasts, if not the oldest, introduced into both the Eastern and Western liturgies to honour a saint.

The Roman Catholic Church celebrates the feast on 29 August, as does the Lutheran Church. Many other churches of the Anglican Communion do so as well, including the Church of England, though some designate it a commemoration rather than a feast day.

The Eastern Orthodox and Byzantine Catholic churches also celebrate this feast on 29 August. This date in the Julian Calendar, used by the Russian, Macedonian, Serbian and Ethiopian Orthodox Churches, corresponds in the twenty-first century to 11 September in the Gregorian Calendar. The day is always observed with strict fasting, and in some cultures, the pious will not eat food from a flat plate, use a knife, or eat round food on this day.

The Armenian Apostolic Church commemorates the Decollation of St. John on the Saturday of Easter Week, while the Syriac Orthodox, Indian Orthodox, and Syro-Malankara Catholic Churches commemorate his death on 7 January.

Related feasts

There are two other related feasts observed by Eastern Christians: 
First and Second Finding of the Head of St. John the Baptist (24 February). According to church tradition, after the execution of John the Baptist, his disciples buried his body at Sebastia, except for his head, which Herodias took and buried it in a dung heap. Later, Saint Joanna, who was married to Herod's steward, secretly took his head and buried it on the Mount of Olives, where it remained hidden for centuries.

The First Finding is said to have occurred in the fourth century. The property on the Mount of Olives where the head was buried eventually passed into the possession of a government official who became a monk with the name of Innocent. He built a church and a monastic cell there. When he started to dig the foundation, the vessel with the head of John the Baptist was uncovered, but fearful that the relic might be abused by unbelievers, he hid it again in the same place it had been found. Upon his death, the church fell into ruin and was destroyed.
The Second Finding is said to have occurred in the year 452. During the days of Constantine the Great, two monks on a pilgrimage to Jerusalem reportedly saw visions of John the Baptist, who revealed to them the location of his head. They uncovered the relic, placed it in a sack and proceeded home. Along the way, they encountered an unnamed potter and gave him the bag to carry, not telling him what it was. John the Baptist appeared to him and ordered him to flee from the careless and lazy monks, with what he held in his hands. He did so and took the head home with him. Before his death, he placed it in a container and gave it to his sister. After some time, a hieromonk by the name of Eustathius, an Arian, came into possession of it, using it to attract followers to his teaching. He buried the head in a cave, near Emesa. Eventually, a monastery was built at that place. In the year 452, St. John the Baptist appeared to Archimandrite Marcellus of this monastery and indicated where his head was hidden in a water jar buried in the earth. The relic was brought into the city of Emesa and was later transferred to Constantinople.

Third Finding of the Head of St. John the Baptist (25 May). The head was transferred to Comana of Cappadocia during a period of Muslim raids (about 820), and it was hidden in the ground during a period of iconoclastic persecution. When the veneration of icons was restored in 850, Patriarch Ignatius of Constantinople (847–857) saw in a vision place where the head of St. John had been hidden. The patriarch communicated this to the emperor Michael III, who sent a delegation to Comana, where the head was found. Afterwards, the head was again transferred to Nyc, and here on 25 May, it was placed in a church at the court.

Relics

 

John the Baptist is said to have been buried at the Palestinian village of Sebastia, near modern-day Nablus in the West Bank. Mention is made of his relics being honored there in the fourth century. The historians Rufinus and Theodoretus record that the shrine was desecrated under Julian the Apostate around 362, the bones being partly burned. The tomb at Sebastia continued, nevertheless, to be visited by pious pilgrims, and St. Jerome bears witness to miracles being worked there. Today, the tomb is housed in the Nabi Yahya Mosque ("John the Baptist Mosque").

John the Baptist's head 
What became of the head of John the Baptist is difficult to determine. Nicephorus and Symeon Metaphrastes say that Herodias had it buried in the fortress of Machaerus (in accordance with Josephus). Other writers say that it was interred in Herod's palace at Jerusalem; there, it was found during the reign of Constantine and thence secretly taken to Emesa, in Phoenicia, where it was concealed, the place remaining unknown for years, until it was manifested by a revelation in 453.

Over the centuries, there have been many discrepancies in the various legends and claimed relics throughout the world. Several different locations claim to possess the severed head of John the Baptist. Among the various claimants are:

A Roman Catholic tradition holds that the head on display in San Silvestro in Capite in Rome is that of John the Baptist.
In medieval times, it was rumored that the Knights Templar had possession of the head, and multiple records from their Inquisition in the early 14th century make reference to some form of head veneration. In France, Catholic Amiens Cathedral contains what it claims to be the head of John the Baptist, brought as a relic from Constantinople by the French leaders of the Fourth Crusade.
Islamic tradition maintains that the head of Saint John the Baptist was interred in the once-called Basilica of Saint John the Baptist in Damascus, now the Umayyad Mosque. Pope John Paul II visited the Mosque during his visit to Syria in 2001.
The Eastern Orthodox Church of John the Baptist in Jerusalem displays a purported fragment of the Skull of John the Baptist.
A reliquary at the Residenz in Munich, Germany, is labeled as containing what previous Bavarian rulers thought was the skull of John the Baptist.
It is also believed by some  that a piece of his skull is held at the Romanian skete Prodromos on Mount Athos.

John the Baptist's right arm 
According to some traditions, Luke the Evangelist went to the city of Sebastia, the place of John's burial site, from which he took the right hand of the Forerunner (the hand that baptized Jesus) and brought it to Antioch, his home city, where it performed miracles. It is reported that the relic would be brought out and shown to the faithful on the Feast of the Exaltation of the Cross (14 September). If the fingers of the hand were open, it was interpreted as a sign of a bountiful year; if the hand was closed, it would be a poor harvest (1 September was the beginning of the liturgical year and the harvest season). 
The arm is then said to have been transferred from Antioch to Constantinople in 956. On 7 January, the Orthodox Church celebrates the "Feast of the Transfer of the Right Hand of the Holy Forerunner" from Antioch to Constantinople and the Miracle of Saint John the Forerunner against the Hagarines at Chios.
In 1204, after the Sack of Constantinople by the Crusaders, the Frankish emperor Baldwin allegedly gave one bone from the wrist of Saint John the Baptist to Ottonus de Cichon, who in turn gave it to a Cistercian abbey in France.
Having been brought from Antioch to Constantinople at the time of Constantine VII, the arm was kept in the Emperor's chapel in the 12th century, then in the Church of the Virgin of the Pharos, then in the Church of Peribleptos in the first half of the 15th century. Spanish envoy Clavijo reported that he saw two different arms in two different monasteries while on a visit to Constantinople in 1404. 
When the Ottomans conquered Constantinople in 1453, they seized possession of the relic. In 1484, Sultan Bayezid II sent it to the knights of Rhodes, who held his brother Cem captive in order to obtain the relic back. Two different accounts then exist as to the fate of the relic: 
The Turks allege that in 1585, Sultan Murad III managed to retrieve the relic from the Christian Knights and had the arm brought back to Constantinople (presently Istanbul, Turkey), where it remains up to this day at the Topkapı Palace. The arm is kept in a gold-embellished silver reliquary. There are several inscriptions on the arm: "The beloved of God" on the forefinger, "This is the hand of the Baptist" on the wrist, and "belongs to (monk) Dolin Monahu" on the band above the elbow.
The Orthodox Christians, nonetheless, claim that, when in 1798 Napoleon conquered the island of Malta, then the Knight's siege, John's arm was one of the few treasures that Grand Master Ferdinand von Hompesch was allowed to take with him. On 12 October 1799, after the resignation of Hompesch, it was presented to Russian emperor Paul I, who had been elected the new Grand Master of the Order, and taken to the chapel of the Priory Palace at Gatchina in Russia. After the Bolshevik Revolution of 1917, Eastern Orthodox Church authorities had it transferred from the church in Gatchina to the Ostrog monastery in Montenegro, and from there to its current location at Cetinje Monastery, also in Montenegro, where it is displayed up to this day.
According to a third version, however, the last Byzantine emperor managed to save the relic from the conquering Ottomans, and sold it to Pope Pius II, who bequeathed it to his hometown, Siena, in whose Cathedral the relic is exposed once a year up to this day.  
Other purported relics include:
It has also been claimed that the right hand is reputed to be kept at the Dionysiou monastery on Mount Athos, Greece.
Relics of John the Baptist are said to be in the possession of the Coptic Orthodox Monastery of Saint Macarius the Great in Scetes, Egypt.
Aachen Cathedral, in Germany, contains a robe supposedly worn by John the Baptist, adored as a relic.
In July 2010, a small reliquary was discovered under the ruins of a 5th-century monastery on St. Ivan Island, Bulgaria. Local archaeologists opened the reliquary in August and found bone fragments of a skull, a hand and a tooth, which they believe belong to John the Baptist, based on their interpretation of a Greek inscription on the reliquary. The Bulgarian Orthodox bishop who witnessed the opening speculated that the relics might have been a gift from an 11th-century church on the island possibly dedicated to the saint. The remains have been carbon-dated to the 1st century.
A reliquary with a purported finger of Saint John the Baptist is displayed in the Nelson-Atkins Museum of Art in Kansas City, Missouri.
On 29 August 2012, during a public audience at the summer palace of Castel Gandolfo, Pope Benedict XVI mentioned the traditional crypt in the Palestinian town of Sebastia, where relics of the Baptist have been venerated since at least the fourth century. The Pope also noted that a religious feast particularly commemorates the transfer of John's head relic to the Basilica of San Silvestro in Capite in Rome.

Biblical Commentary
The Catholic German theologian, Friedrich Justus Knecht wrote that: 
St. John died a martyr to his calling. Having been called by God to be a preacher of penance, he represented Herod’s sin to him, and reminded him of the law of God. On this account he died a violent death at the age of thirty-two. To him applies the eighth beatitude: “Blessed are they who suffer persecution, for justice’ sake.” His soul passed directly into Limbo, where he, like St. Joseph, awaited the arrival of the Messias, and the speedy accomplishment of the work of Redemption. When our Lord ascended into heaven, he was taken up with Him into everlasting happiness. The Church honours him as a great Saint, and on the 24th of June celebrates his nativity, because he was born without original sin.  

The subsequent history of Herod and Salome is related in the great commentary of Cornelius a Lapide:
Wherefore the just vengeance of God burned against all who were concerned in this crime. Herod was defeated by Aretas. Afterwards he was banished with Herodias to Lyons, and deprived of his tetrarchy and everything by Caligula, at the instigation of Herod Agrippa, the brother of Herodias, as Josephus relates (xvii. 10). Moreover, the head of the dancing daughter was cut off by means of ice. Hear what Nicephorus says, “As she was journeying once in the winter-time, and a frozen river had to be crossed on foot, the ice broke beneath her, not without the providence of God. Straightway she sank down up to her neck. This made her dance and wriggle about with all the lower parts of her body, not on land, but in the water. Her wicked head was glazed with ice, and at length severed from her body by the sharp edges, not of iron, but of the frozen water. Thus in the very ice she displayed the dance of death, and furnished a spectacle to all who beheld it, which brought to mind what she had done.

Depictions of Salome, Herod, and the death of John the Baptist

Scenes from the events around the death of John were an extremely common subject in the treatment of John the Baptist in art, initially most often in small predella scenes, and later as a subject for larger independent works.  The following list does not attempt completeness but begins with works with their own articles, then includes many of the best-known depictions in chronological order (to see each work, follow the link through the footnote):

With articles
Herod's Banquet, Donatello, 1427
The Beheading of Saint John the Baptist, Giovanni di Paolo, 1455–1460, Art Institute of Chicago
Salome with the Head of Saint John the Baptist, Titian, c. 1515, Galleria Doria Pamphilj, Rome
Salome with the Head of John the Baptist, Caravaggio, c. 1607–1610, National Gallery, London
Salome with the Head of John the Baptist, Caravaggio, c. 1609, Palacio Real, Madrid
The Beheading of Saint John the Baptist, Caravaggio, 1608, Valletta Co-Cathedral, Malta
Feast of Herod with the Beheading of St John the Baptist, Bartholomeus Strobel, c. 1630–43, Prado
Other
Herod's Feast, Daurade Monastery, c. 1100, Musée des Augustins, Toulouse.
Death of John the Baptist, Gilabertus, Saint-Etienne Cathedral, 1120–1140, Musee des Augustins, Toulouse
Feast of Herod, Giotto di Bondone, 1320
The Feast of Herod and the Beheading of the Baptist, Master of the Life of Saint John the Baptist, c. 1300–1330, Metropolitan Museum of Art
Entombment of the Baptist, Andrea Pisano, 1330
St. John the Evangelist and Stories from His Life, Giovanni del Biondo, 1360–70
Feast of Herod, Spinello Aretino, 1385
The Banquet of Herod, Lorenzo Monaco, c. 1400
The Beheading of St. John the Baptist, Masaccio, 1426
Banquet of Herod, Masolino da Panicale, 1435
Herod's Banquet, Fra Filippo Lippi, 1452–65
The Head of John the Baptist Brought to Herod, Giovanni di Paolo, 1454, National Gallery, London
The Feast of Herod and the Beheading of Saint John the Baptist, Benozzo Gozzoli, 1461–62, National Gallery of Art
The Head of St John the Baptist, Giovanni Bellini, 1464–68
The Beheading of St. John the Baptist, Lieven van Lathem, 1469, The J. Paul Getty Museum
Herod's Feast, Heydon, Norfolk, c. 1470, wall painting in an English parish church
St. John Altarpiece, Hans Memling, 1474–79
Beheading of John the Baptist, Andrea del Verrocchio, 1477–80
Salome with the Head of St. John the Baptist, Sandro Botticelli, 1488, Uffizi, Florence
Salome with the Head of John the Baptist, Cornelis Engelbrechtsz, c. 1490, J. Paul Getty Museum
The Head of St. John the Baptist, with Mourning Angels and Putti, Jan Mostaert, early 16th century, National Gallery, London
St. John Altarpiece (left wing), Quentin Massys, 1507–08
The Beheading of St. John, Albrecht Dürer, 1510, Christian Theological Seminary, Indianapolis
The Daughter of Herodias, Sebastiano del Piombo, 1510, National Gallery, London
Salome, Tilman Riemenschneider, 1500–1510
Salome, Casare da Sesta, 1510–20, National Gallery, London
Salome, Giampietrino, c. 1510–30, National Gallery, London
The Head of St. John the Baptist Brought to Herod, Albrecht Dürer, 1511
Salome, Alonso Berruguete, 1512–16, Uffizi Gallery, Florence
The Beheading of Saint John the Baptist, Hans Fries, 1514, Kunstmuseum Basel
Salome with the Head of John the Baptist, Titian, c. 1515
Head of John the Baptist, Hans Baldung Grien, 1516, National Gallery of Art
Salome with the Head of John the Baptist, Jacob Cornelisz van Oostsanen, Rijksmuseum, Amsterdam
Herodias, Bernardino Luini, 1527–31
Salome, Lucas Cranach the Elder, c. 1530
Beheading of John the Baptist, Vincenzo Danti, 1569–70
Salome, Giovanni Battista Caracciolo, 1615–20
The Feast of Herod, Frans Francken the Younger, c. 1620, State Hermitage Museum
 Head of Saint John the Baptist, Juan de Mesa (ca. 1625) Seville Cathedral
Herodias with the Head of St. John the Baptist, Francesco del Cairo, c. 1625–30
The Beheading of John the Baptist, Matthaeus Merrian the Elder, 1625–30
Decapitation of St. John, Unknown British, 17th century, Tate Gallery
Salome Dancing before Herod, Jacob Hogers, c. 1630–55, Rijksmuseum
Salome Presented with the Head of St. John the Baptist, Leonaert Bramer, 1630s
The Beheading of St. John the Baptist, Massimo Stanzione, c. 1634
Salome Receives the Head of John the Baptist, Guercino, 1637, Museum of Fine Arts of Rennes, French Wikipedia page
Salome with the Head of John the Baptist, Guido Reni, 1639–40
The Beheading of John the Baptist, Rembrandt, 1640, The Fine Arts Museums of San Francisco
The Beheading of John the Baptist, Rombout van Troyen, 1650s, State Hermitage Museum
St John Reproaching Herod, Mattia Preti, 1662–66
St John the Baptist Before Herod, Mattia Preti, 1665
Decapitation of St John, British School, 17th century, Tate Gallery
John the Baptist Beheaded, Julius Schnorr von Carolsfeld, 1851–60, World Mission Collection
The Daughter of Herodias Receiving the Head of John the Baptist, Gustave Doré, 1865
Head of St. John the Baptist, 1869, The J. Paul Getty Museum
The Beheading of John the Baptist, Pierre Puvis de Chavannes, c. 1869, National Gallery, London
Salome, Henri Regnault, 1870, Metropolitan Museum of Art
Gustave Moreau:
Salome Dancing before Herod, 1874–76
The Apparition, 1874–76
Salome, 1876
Hérodias, Gustave Flaubert, 1877
James Tissot, 1886–96:
The Daughter of Herodias Dancing
King Herod
The Head of John the Baptist on a Platter
Salome, Franz von Stuck, 1906
Salome, Nikolai Astrup
Salome With the Head of John the Baptist, Aubrey Beardsley,

See also
 Chronology of Jesus
 Messengers from John the Baptist

Notes

Further reading

External links

Beheading of the Forerunner Icon and Synaxarion of the feast (Eastern Orthodox)
The Decollation of Saint John Baptist from The Golden Legend (1275)
Beheading of Saint John the Baptist from the Prologue from Ochrid
First and Second Finding of the Head of the Forerunner
Third Finding of the Head of the Forerunner
January 7  Synaxis of John the Forerunner – accounts of various relics

John the Baptist
Eastern Orthodox liturgical days
Saints days
Gospel episodes
John the Baptist
Individual human heads, skulls and brains
August observances
People executed by decapitation
Salome